Ruta Madre is a 2017: Mexican, American, comedy and drama film directed by Agustin Castañeda and starring David Castro, William Miller, Lia Marie Johnson, Carmen Salinas, Angélica María, Paulina Gaitan and Paul Rodriguez.

Plot
Ruta Madre is the story of a rite of passage where American culture and Rock and Roll meet the music, traditions, and beauty of Mexico. Based on a true story, the film chronicles the story of Daniel, a talented young Mexican-American singer and his cynical uncle Rodrigo. When his first love Daisy breaks his heart, in emotional agony Daniel reluctantly leaves his home in San Diego, California and embarks on a road trip with his uncle, who is also on the run from a past that haunts him.

This comical, dramatic and spiritual journey begins at the US/Mexico border, and winds its way through Tijuana, Ensenada, down the majestic Baja peninsula, through the sleepy French mining town of Santa Rosalia, and finally arriving at a family ranch in Ciudad Constitution. A friendly witch, unlikely angels, enticing demons, righteous Federales, a prostitute full of hope, a peculiar drug dealer and even the most beautiful woman in the world, are just some of the characters Daniel and Rodrigo meet along the way.

Cast
Paulina Gaitán as Colette
Lia Marie Johnson as Daisy
David Castro as Daniel
Héctor Jiménez as Officer Benitez
Paul Rodriguez as Flaco
William Miller as Rodrigo
Sandra Luesse as Cherrie
Angélica María as Agata
Carmen Salinas as Doña Ceci
Luis Felipe Tovar as Comandante
Reinaldo Zavarce as Jose Ibarra

References

External links
 
 
 

2017 films
Mexican comedy-drama films
American comedy-drama films
2010s Spanish-language films
2010s English-language films
2010s American films
2010s Mexican films